Jason Lawrence Brown (born December 15, 1994) is an American figure skater. He is a nine-time Grand Prix medalist, a two-time Four Continents medalist (2020 silver, 2018 bronze), and the 2015 U.S. national champion. Earlier in his career, he became a two-time World Junior medalist (2013 silver, 2012 bronze), the 2011 Junior Grand Prix Final champion, and the 2010 junior national champion.

Brown won a bronze medal in the team event at the 2014 Winter Olympics in Sochi, becoming one of the youngest male figure skating Olympic medalists.

Personal life
Brown was born on December 15, 1994, in Los Angeles, California. His mother, Marla (Kell), is a television producer, and his father, Steven Brown, works for a lighting company. He has an older sister, Jordan, and a younger brother, Dylan. He is Jewish and celebrated his bar mitzvah in 2007.

Brown graduated from Highland Park High School and received the Ralph Potter Memorial Award for Exceptional Ability and Achievement and the President's Education Award for Outstanding Academic Excellence. In 2013, he enrolled at the University of Colorado Colorado Springs. He plays piano.

Brown came out as gay via Instagram post on June 11, 2021.

Career

Early years
Brown began skating at age three and a half when his mother enrolled him and his sister in Learn to Skate classes. Coached by Kori Ade since the age of five, he trained at various rinks in the Chicago area until April 2013. Since 2009, his programs have been choreographed mainly by Rohene Ward. Brown also skated pairs with Thea Milburn for three years.

At 11, Brown won the national juvenile title. He won the bronze medal on the novice level at the 2009 U.S. Championships. Competing on the junior level at the 2010 U.S. Championships, he placed second in the short program, 0.07 behind Max Aaron, and second to Joshua Farris in the long program. Brown's overall score was the highest and he won the national junior title.

2010–2011 season 

Brown won the silver medal in his Junior Grand Prix debut in France and placed sixth in his second JGP event in Japan. He finished 9th in his senior national debut at the 2011 U.S. Championships with an impressive performance despite not attempting a triple Axel, which he had decided to put off due to a growth spurt. He was assigned to compete at the 2011 World Junior Championships, where he finished 7th. Brown worked on the triple Axel for the following season while adapting to another growth spurt. He stopped wearing hinge boots.

2011–2012 season 
Brown began his season with a win at his first Junior Grand Prix event in Brisbane, Australia. He then took silver in Milan, Italy, to qualify for the final. In a December 2011 interview, Brown said that he needed the triple Axel to be competitive on the senior level and continued to work on it. He occasionally used Dartfish, a computer imaging system, and a harness. At the Junior Grand Prix Final, Brown was second in both segments and won the gold medal overall. Brown was assigned to the 2012 World Junior Championships and won the bronze medal.

2012–2013 season 

Brown won gold and silver medals on the JGP series and qualified for his second JGP Final, where he finished fourth. He placed eighth at the 2013 U.S. Figure Skating Championships. He was sent to the 2013 World Junior Championships, where he placed third in the short program and first in the free skate after landing two triple Axels for the first time in his career. Brown won the silver medal while fellow Americans Joshua Farris and Shotaro Omori took the gold and bronze medals, respectively.

2013–2014 season

In May 2013, Brown and his coach, Kori Ade, moved to the Colorado Sports Center in Monument, Colorado. His secondary coaches include Eddie Shipstad and Ryan Jahnke.

Brown won the silver medal in his senior international debut at the 2013 Nebelhorn Trophy in Oberstdorf, Germany. On September 30, 2013, he was called up to replace reigning Olympic champion Evan Lysacek at Skate America after the latter withdrew due to injury. Brown finished fifth at the event, his first senior Grand Prix event. In November 2013, he competed at a Grand Prix event in Paris, the 2013 Trophée Éric Bompard, and won the bronze medal. He also attracted much attention from the skating public and the French, in particular, becoming a crowd favorite.

At the U.S. Championships in January 2014, Brown placed third in the short program and first in the free skate with his Riverdance program, which became a viral video garnering more than 4 million hits. He won the silver medal and was named in the U.S. team to the 2014 Winter Olympics in Sochi, Russia. In Sochi, while Jeremy Abbott skated the short program in the team event, Brown was assigned to the free program and placed fourth. He and team USA were awarded the bronze medal. In the singles event, he was in sixth place after the short program but less than a point off third. He placed eleventh in the free skate and finished ninth overall. At the end of the season, he performed in twelve Stars on Ice shows before returning to training.

2014–2015 season
Brown began the 2014–15 season at the 2014 Nebelhorn Trophy, an ISU Challenger Series event, and won the gold medal after placing first in both programs. At 2014 Skate America, he came in second. He placed fifth at 2014 Rostelecom Cup with a personal best in the free skate of 159.24 points. His placements earned him 7th place in the Grand Prix series, just missing the cut for the final.

At the 2015 U.S. Championships, Brown won the short program with the second-highest points in the U.S. Championships' history. He finished the free skating second and won his first U.S. title. Until then, he had not tried a quad jump in competition. At the 2015 Four Continents Championships, he tried a quad jump in the short program, placing ninth. In the free skate, he set his personal best and finished sixth overall.

Brown placed fourth overall at the 2015 World Figure Skating Championships, placing sixth in the short program and fifth in the free skate. At the 2015 ISU World Team Trophy, he placed second overall to contribute to Team USA's gold medal.

2015–2016 season
Brown began his season by winning the gold medal at 2015 Ondrej Nepela Trophy. At his first Grand Prix event of the season, 2015 Skate America, he won the bronze medal after placing eighth in the short program and third in the free skate. He then won the silver medal at 2015 CS Ice Challenge. Brown withdrew from the 2015 NHK Trophy due to a back injury. He returned to the ice two weeks later, but the injury resurfaced and forced him to withdraw from the 2016 U.S. Championships. On January 22, NBC Sports reported that he had petitioned U.S. Figure Skating for a spot on the world team despite his inability to compete at the national championships. His petition cited his world ranking, international experience, and competitive record. The USFSA denied his petition and named Adam Rippon, Max Aaron, and Nathan Chen, who Grant Hochstein later replaced due to injury.

Brown ended his season at the 2016 Team Challenge Cup. He placed second in the third short program group and second in the free skate.

2016–2017 season
Brown began his season at 2016 Lombardia Trophy, where he won the silver medal after placing second in the short program and first in the free skate. At the 2016 U.S. International Classic, he won the gold medal after placing second in the short program and first in the free skate.

Brown placed third in the short program at the 2016 Skate America. During the free skate, he performed a quad toe which was deemed underrotated by the technical panel. He finished second in the free skate, earning the silver medal behind Shoma Uno. He placed eighth in the short program and seventh in the free skate to place seventh overall at the 2016 NHK Trophy.

On December 16, 2016, Brown was diagnosed with a stress fracture in his right fibula. He received the bronze medal at the 2017 U.S. Championships.

He placed sixth overall at the 2017 Four Continents Championships after placing ninth in the short program and sixth in the free skate. At the 2017 World Championships, he placed seventh overall after placing eighth in the short program and seventh in the free skate.

At 2017 World Team Trophy, Brown placed 6th overall to contribute to Team USA's bronze medal.

2017–2018 season
Brown began his season by winning the silver medal at 2017 Lombardia Trophy.

Brown won silver at the 2017 Skate Canada International after placing third in the short program and second in the free skate. At the 2017 NHK Trophy, he ranked third in the short program but ended the competition in fourth place. As a result, he finished as the first alternate for the Grand Prix Final. Although he had tied with Jin Boyang at 22 points, Jin won the tiebreaker by scoring 3.34 points higher than Brown. After Jin's withdrawal, Brown was called up to compete at his first senior-level Grand Prix Final. He finished 6th at the event in Nagoya, Japan.

In January, Brown finished sixth at the 2018 U.S. Championships after placing third in the short program and sixth in the free skate. U.S. Figure Skating named him as first alternate for the 2018 Winter Olympics. He was assigned to the 2018 Four Continents Championships in Taipei, Taiwan. Ranked fourth in the short and third in the free, he won the bronze medal, achieving his first podium finish at a senior-level ISU Championship. After Adam Rippon withdrew from the 2018 World Championships, Brown, who was first alternate, declined U.S. Figure Skating's invitation and it was transferred to Max Aaron.

In late May 2018, Brown announced his decision to leave his coaching team in Colorado and move to Brian Orser, Tracy Wilson, Karen Preston, and Lee Barkell at the Toronto Cricket, Skating and Curling Club in Toronto, Ontario, Canada. Brown and Orser stated that Kori Ade would remain an influence on Brown's career.

2018–2019 season
At his first event of the season, the 2018 CS Autumn Classic International, Brown placed third in the short program, fifth in the free program, and fourth overall. He placed eleventh in the short program at 2018 Skate Canada International after underrotating and falling on his triple Axel and underrotating his triple Lutz-double toe loop combination.  He fared better in the free skate, where he placed sixth, moving to sixth place overall. At the 2018 Internationaux de France, he placed second overall after winning the short program with a then-personal best score of 96.41 and placed third in the free program. Competing at a second Challenger event, the 2018 CS Golden Spin, he won the gold medal after placing second in the short program and first in the free skate.

At the 2019 US Championships, he won the bronze medal after placing second in the short program and third in the free skate.

At the 2019 Four Continents Championships, Brown placed sixth in the short program and moved up to fifth overall after placing fourth in the free program.  In his free skate, Brown avoided popping his opening quad Salchow for the first time that season, though it was deemed underrotated, and he stepped out of the landing.

At the 2019 World Championships, he placed second in the short program, with a new personal best score of 96.81, winning a silver small medal. He placed fourteenth in the free skate after a poor skate and placed ninth overall at the event.  He expressed satisfaction with his season overall.

2019–2020 season
While traveling to a U.S. Figure Skating training camp in August 2019, the car Brown was traveling in was impacted by another vehicle, as a result of which Brown sustained a concussion.  Restricted from training, Brown withdrew from the 2019 CS Nebelhorn Trophy.  He was cleared to compete at 2019 Skate America, his first Grand Prix of the season. Brown popped his planned triple Axel to a single in the short program, placing fourth in that segment.  In the free skate, Brown performed all his jumps successfully other than doubling a planned triple loop, placing second in that segment to take the silver medal.  At the 2019 NHK Trophy, Brown placed eighth in the short program and fourth in the free skate to place fifth overall.  Two weeks later, he won the gold medal at 2019 CS Golden Spin of Zagreb.

Brown won the silver medal at the 2020 U.S. Championships after placing second in both segments. In the free skate, he attempted a quad toe loop, which was downgraded but landed without program interruption.

At the 2020 Four Continents Championships, Brown placed third in the short program with a clean skate, defeating several skaters who performed at least one quadruple jump.  In the free skate, Brown doubled an attempted quad toe loop but landed all his other jumps successfully and placed second in the segment with a new personal best of 180.11, moving into second place overall.  He was assigned to compete at the World Championships in Montreal, but it was canceled as a result of the coronavirus pandemic.

2020–2021 season 
Brown was assigned to compete at the 2020 Skate Canada International, but the event was also canceled due to the pandemic.

As a result, Brown made his season debut at the 2021 U.S. Championships in Las Vegas, placing third in the short program with a clean skate.  In the free skate, he fell on a quad toe loop that was also deemed underrotated and singled a planned triple Axel, placing fourth in that segment, but remained in third place overall and won the bronze medal. He was named to the American team for the 2021 World Championships in Stockholm.

Brown placed seventh in the short program at the World Championships with a clean skate. Brown attempted a quad Salchow jump in the free skate, but it was deemed underrotated. Making one other minor jump error, he was eighth in that segment and remained seventh overall. Brown and Nathan Chen's placements at the World Championships were sufficient to qualify at least two berths for American men at the 2022 Winter Olympics, but only the possibility of a third because Vincent Zhou failed to qualify for the free skate.

Brown competed at the 2021 World Team Trophy, where he served as team captain and helped Team USA win the silver medal. He placed third in the short program and eighth in the free skate, with his total score ranking sixth among the men.

2021–2022 season 
Brown made his season debut at the 2021 CS Finlandia Trophy, winning the gold medal. Returning to the Grand Prix, he took the silver medal at the 2021 Skate Canada International to start. He said he was "a little disappointed" with the free skate after two jump errors but overall was satisfied with his result. Brown went on to place third in the short program and fourth in the free skate at the 2021 Internationaux de France, winning the bronze medal and thus medaling at both of his Grand Prix events for the first time in his career. Attempting a quad Salchow in the free skate, he two-footed the landing but was credited with full rotation for the first time. Brown's results qualified him to the Grand Prix Final, but it was subsequently canceled due to restrictions prompted by the Omicron variant.

Traveling to attend the 2022 U.S. Championships with coach Tracy Wilson proved to be an odyssey for Brown due to five different flight cancellations that had him in transit for thirty-three hours, culminating in a rental car trip from Atlanta to Nashville. Despite this, he skated a clean short program and placed fourth in that segment, narrowly behind third-place Ilia Malinin. On the morning of the free skate, Wilson tested positive for COVID and could not accompany him to the event; Brown tested negative the same day. In the free skate, he fell on his opening quad Salchow attempt but landed the rest of his jumps. Normally regarded as one of the best spinners in the world, on one of his three free skate spins, he lost two levels, which made the difference between third and fourth overall as he finished 0.38 points behind bronze medalist Vincent Zhou. Per the selection criteria for the American Olympic team, Zhou and national champion Nathan Chen were guaranteed berths, with the third to be decided between Brown and 17-year-old surprise silver medalist Ilia Malinin. The committee ultimately chose Brown, which was controversial with some. On Malinin, he said, "there's nothing I can say that can encompass how he might be feeling at this moment. What I can say is he is beyond out of this world, and U.S. figure skating is so lucky to have such a bright future with Ilia." For his part, Brown said that it had been "a really tough go to get here. Not just in the last 72 hours, but in the last four years and everything leading up to this point and me kind of turning a page after 2018."

Competing at the 2022 Winter Olympics in the men's event, Brown skated a clean short program and placed sixth with a new personal best score of 97.24. He said it was "a long time coming," noting that it had taken "eight years trying to get back to this stage to be able to put out a performance like that." In the free skate, he elected not to attempt a quadruple jump and skated a nearly clean program, with the lone error being a doubled attempt at a triple Salchow. He finished sixth in that segment as well, remaining sixth overall.

2022–2023 season 
Brown, by his own later admission, had not intended to compete further following the Olympic season, and moved out of his longtime Toronto apartment to relocate back to the United States. However, after accepting an invitation to compete at the Japan Open in the fall, he prepared a new free skate to "The Impossible Dream" from Man of La Mancha. He placed fifth at the Japan Open, and found his competitive drive reawakened by the experience, at which point he decided to return for the second half of the season starting with the national championships.

At the 2023 U.S. Championships in San Jose, Brown placed second in the short program, 10.11 points behind favorite Ilia Malinin. He was third in the free skate, fractionally behind Andrew Torgashev and Malinin, but won the silver medal. Brown said that he felt he had faced down "demons" by competing successfully in San Jose, the sight of his failure to qualify for the 2018 Olympic team that he personally considered the low point of his career.

Programs

Competitive highlights
GP: Grand Prix; CS: Challenger Series; JGP: Junior Grand Prix

2009–10 to present

2005–06 to 2008–09

Detailed results

Small medals for short program and free skating awarded only at ISU Championships. At team events, medals awarded for team results only. ISU personal bests highlighted in bold. Historic ISU personal bests highlighted in bold.

Senior level

Junior and Novice level

See also
List of select Jewish figure skaters

References

External links

 Official site
 
 
 

1994 births
Living people
American male single skaters
Figure skaters at the 2014 Winter Olympics
Jewish American sportspeople
Medalists at the 2014 Winter Olympics
Olympic bronze medalists for the United States in figure skating
Olympic medalists in figure skating
Figure skaters from Los Angeles
University of Colorado Colorado Springs alumni
World Junior Figure Skating Championships medalists
Four Continents Figure Skating Championships medalists
American LGBT sportspeople
LGBT people from Illinois
LGBT figure skaters
Gay sportsmen
21st-century American Jews
LGBT people from California
Figure skaters at the 2022 Winter Olympics